Coiled-coil domain containing 18 is a protein that in humans is encoded by the CCDC18 gene.

References

Further reading